Kaveri Nagar is a neighbourhood of the city of Tiruchirappalli in Tamil Nadu, India.

References 

Neighbourhoods and suburbs of Tiruchirappalli